Stordalen or Stordal is a village in the municipality of Meråker in Trøndelag county, Norway. It is the location of Stordalen Chapel.

References

Villages in Trøndelag
Meråker